Love After Love is a 1992 French romance film directed by Diane Kurys starring Isabelle Huppert and Bernard Giraudeau.

Cast
 Isabelle Huppert as Lola
 Bernard Giraudeau as David
 Hippolyte Girardot as Tom
 Lio as Marianne
 Yvan Attal as Romain
 Judith Reval as Rachel
 Ingrid Held as Anne
 Laure Killing as Elisabeth
 Pierre Amzallag as Babysitter
 Mehdi Joossen as Simon
 Florian Billion as Olivier
 Eva Killing as Caroline
 Ana Girardot as Juliette
 Renée Amzallagas as Rebecca
 Philippe Chany as Manager

Year-end lists
 Honorable mention – Michael MacCambridge, Austin American-Statesman

See also
 Isabelle Huppert on screen and stage

References

External links

1992 films
1990s French-language films
1990s romance films
Films directed by Diane Kurys
French romantic drama films
1990s French films